Tolumnia pulchella is a species of orchid endemic to Jamaica. It is the type species of the genus Tolumnia.

References 

pulchella
Orchids of Jamaica
Endemic flora of Jamaica
Endemic orchids of North America
Flora without expected TNC conservation status